Eloy Fernando Fritsch (born 1968) is an electronic musician, keyboard player and main composer of Brazilian progressive rock band Apocalypse. As a solo artist he creates cosmic new-age music.

History

In 1983 Fritsch formed progressive rock band Apocalypse. They are considered pivotal in the development of progressive rock in Southern Brazil.

In 1992, he moved to Porto Alegre and began his solo project composing electronic music. His first official solo album was Dreams, recorded in 1994 and 1995. During 1997, he released his second solo album, Behind the Walls of Imagination, which showcases his skills with various electronic and acoustic keyboard instruments. In the mid-1990s, Fritsch secured a recording contract with French label Musea. His third album for them, Space Music, was released in 1998.

The composer reveals his sci-fi style with Cyberspace. In this album Fritsch offers 1970s-inspired keyboard symphonic/electronic progressive instrumental music. Fritsch performs electronic music that evolves between Vangelis' ambient and impressionist electronic, and the synthesized progressive rock of masters such as Rick Wakeman. Nevertheless, Fritsch has found his own style within melodic electronic music framework. The compositions are very melodic and emotive, with multi-layered instrumental textures/voicings and solidly coherent arrangements.

Fritsch has earned a PhD in computer music, and has served as a teacher of electronic music at the Federal University of Rio Grande do Sul (UFRGS). During 1999, Fritsch created the Electronic Music Center in the Institute of Arts at UFRGS.

In parallel with his work as keyboard player of the group Apocalypse and his academic activity, Fritsch releases music as a solo musician (through the Musea and Rock Symphony labels), such as the album Mythology, a large variety of original musical works in which he brings to maturity the use of synthesizers to compose melodic electronic music. This ambitious work uses the whole panel of his electronic sounds to depict fifteen tracks exclusively dedicated to the different gods worshiped in the past. Different cultures, such as Brazilian, Mesopotamian, Hindu, Amerindian, Inca, African, Greek, Egyptian, Scandinavian, Roman and Chinese, are outlined in the Mythology album by an instrumental composition, thanks to his panoply of keyboards including a Roland System 700 modular synthesizer.

Eloy Fritsch's love of the sky inspired him to compose the electronic suite Atmosphere (2003). Once again the composer reveals his ecological convictions: he presently defends the virtues of the gas envelope that allow everyone to live on Earth: the Atmosphere.

Landscapes (2005) was Fritsch's next work to emerge on disc.

In 2007 Eloy Fritsch wrote the book "Electronic Music" that was released in 2008 during the Book Fair in Porto Alegre. The book is accompanied by a DVD containing the electroacoustic compositions Synapse 5.1, Synthetic Horizon, Public Market, Indian Sampler, Mystery and Silicon Child created during his research in Electronic Music Center at Federal University of Rio Grande do Sul, Brazil. Eloy Fritsch received the Açorianos Music Awards. The awards ceremony happened on 28 April 2008, Tuesday night at the São Pedro Theater, Porto Alegre, Brazil. The Açorianos Music Awards honor the best albums, musicians and contributions to the music in South o Brazil. The ceremony was broadcast on television and event production presented a short film about the music and artistic works of the composer.

In 2009 Eloy Fritsch played keyboards in several concerts with the Apocalypse. He also released the album The Garden of Emotions. Musea company distributed the CD in Europe. The recorded company wrote the following lines about the album: "The ninth album The Garden of Emotions presents symphonic themes with choirs, analog and digital synthesizers dominating. Fans of classic VANGELIS, Jean-Michel JARRE and Rick WAKEMAN works will enjoy this. Some of the more solemn themes remind Isao TOMITA. "Lumine Solis" is one of the best compositions and a choir-laden track. "Solar Energy" introduces a spacier atmosphere, with phasing pads and Berlin School sequences. This is pure electronic music and a very good one, with all sorts of really fat analog timbres. "Beyond The Mountains" is a very cinematic and return to the classically inspired structures, with an extra ethnic elements. "Electric Light" is synthetic and even KRAFTWERK-like, with insisting sequences, vocoders and a simple repeating melodic theme. Flutes, marimba sound and percussion welcome the coming of "Savage" before a melodic synthesizers theme appears. "Space Station" is another foray into a purely synthetic world and you could also draw a comparison with Jean-Michel JARRE's "Chronologie". "The Canyon of Hope" finishes this album with flowing synthesizers, symphonic textures and a reflective electric piano".

In the same year Fritsch was also honored on the Journey of Literature event in the Passo Fundo city, Brazil. The composer received the trophy Vasco Prado.

In 2010 Fritsch worked on two major projects: In the production of The Apocalypse 25th Anniversary Box Set (2 CDs, 1 DVD and the book about the Apocalypse Hystory) and the MCT Project – Music, Science and Technology funded by the Brazilian government. Fritsch has created the Brazilian Virtual Museum of Synthesizer and a documentary film about electronic music to be distributed to schools and music teachers. He also created an exhibition of electronic music at the museum of the university.

In 2011 Eloy Fritsch perform in South of Brazil with Apocalypse, Orchestra and Choral during the Symphonic Rock Concert and the group received the Açorianos Music Awards. The awards ceremony happened on 9 May 2012, Wednesday night at the São Pedro Theater, Porto Alegre, Brazil. The Açorianos Music Awards honor contribution of the Apocalypse group to the music in South of Brazil.

The tenth Eloy Fritsch CD brings Exogenesis Suite in four movements inspired by the genesis of the universe. In addition to this suite the CD contains more eight individual tracks. Joining the symphonic and electronic, but without forgetting the ethnic instruments and the voices, the composer of new-age music uses high technology in the service of emotions to create compositions. The CD cover and booklet images were created by European artists specializing in science fiction illustrations Maciej Rebisz and Mirek Drozd and refer to the creation of the cosmos and the existence of other life forms.

Selected discography

With Apocalypse
 1991 – Apocalypse 
 1995 – Perto do Amanhecer 
 1996 – Aurora dos Sonhos 
 1997 – Lendas Encantadas 
 1998 – The Best of Apocalypse (Compilation)
 2001 – Live in USA (Live)
 2003 – Refugio 
 2004 – Magic 
 2006 – Apocalypse Live in Rio 
 2006 – DVD Apocalypse Live in Rio 
 2006 – The Bridge of Light 
 2006 – DVD The 25th Anniversary Concert 
 2010 – Magic Spells 
 2011 – 2012 Light Years from Home 
 2011 – The 25th Anniversary Box Set
 2013 – DVD The Bridge of Light

Solo works
 1996 – Dreams
 1997 – Behind the Walls of Imagination 
 1998 – Space Music 
 2000 – Cyberspace 
 2001 – Mythology 
 2003 – Atmosphere – Electronic Suite 
 2005 – Landscapes
 2006 – Past and Future Sounds – 1996-2006 
 2009 – The Garden of Emotions 
 2012 – Exogenesis 
 2014 – Spiritual Energy
 2017 – Sailing to the Edge
 2019 – Journey to the Future
 2020 – Moment in Paradise
 2021 – Cosmic Light

Compilations featuring Eloy Fritsch 
 1997 – Planeta Nova Era Vol. 7 Track: Lake of Peace Movement 1 and 2
 1999 – Planeta Nova Era Vol. 13 Track: Cosmic Winds
 1999 – Planeta Nova Era Vol. 14 Track: Starlight
 2002 – Margen – Music from the Edge Vol. 6 – Track: Ionosphere
 2005 – Edition #5 Track: The Garden of Emotions Suite
 2006 – Brasil Instrumental 2006 Track: The Garden of Emotions Suite
 2006 – Compact Mellotron 34 Track: Andromeda
 2006 – Edition #13 Track: Shiva
 2006 – Edition #14 Track: Atlantis
 2006 – Edition #15 Track: Andromeda
 2009 – Brazilian Electroacoustic Music Compilation Track: Synthetic Horizon
 2012 – Schwingungen Radio auf CD – Edition Nr.210 11/12. Track: Moonwalk
 2019 – Schwingungen Radio auf CD – Edition Nr.290 07/19. Track: Mermaids Island
 2021 – Schwingungen Radio auf CD – Edition Nr.308 01/21. Track: Spacetime

Keyboards used by Fritsch 

Throughout his albums Fritsch uses several instruments. Some of these are:

Minimoog
Roland JD-800
Roland JP-8000
Roland JP-8080
Roland Juno-106
Roland JX-3P
Roland System 700
Roland AX-1
Roland VK-8
Casio CZ-5000
Casio AZ-1
Korg MS-10
Korg MS-20
Korg 01/W
Korg M1
Korg Triton
Korg Polysix
Korg Delta
Korg MS2000R
Yamaha SY77
Yamaha DX-21
Clavia Nord Modular
Kurzweil K-2600
Ensoniq MR76
Digitech Vocalist
AKAI S-5000
Tokai Tx5-DS Plus
Labolida Nano1
M-audio Piano Pro Keys 88
Korg Oasys
Korg Triton Extreme
Korg Kronos
Roland Sysytem-8
Roland Jupiter-80
Behringer DeepMind12
Roland Gaia
Roland FA-06
Roland FA-08

See also
 Apocalypse
 List of ambient music artists

References

External links 
 
 
 info and sounds.
 Eloy Fritsch music on Artist Direct.
 info, reviews and discography.

1968 births
New-age synthesizer players
Brazilian electronic musicians
Brazilian keyboardists
Progressive rock musicians
Rock keyboardists
Living people
New-age musicians
New-age composers
Art rock musicians
Brazilian people of German descent
People from Rio Grande do Sul
People from Caxias do Sul
Electroacoustic music composers
Brazilian composers
Brazilian rock musicians